Wien Praterkai is a railway station serving Leopoldstadt, the second district of Vienna.

Services 
 the following services stop at Wien Praterkai:

References

External links 
 
 

Railway stations in Vienna
Austrian Federal Railways